McLaughlin Middle School and Fine Arts Academy is a Polk County Public Schools middle school located southeast of downtown in Lake Wales, FL.

History 
The school opened in 1964 as Lake Wales Junior High School.  Its name was changed in 1985 to McLaughlin Junior High, then McLaughlin Middle School.

Arts Academy 
Modeled after a similar institution in Detroit, McLaughlin added more intensive fine arts programs in 2007 .   The school changed its name to the McLaughlin Middle School and Fine Arts Academy. The school is now one of four middle schools to have an arts focus in Polk County.

In 2011, McLaughlin was designated an Arts Achieve! Model School by the Florida Alliance for Arts Education.  Through the 2013-2014 school year, it helped other schools around Florida develop their visual and performing arts programs.

Dress Code 
The McLaughlin Middle dress code requires students to wear khaki or black pants, shorts, or skirts, along with the assigned school shirt. The color of shirt is determined by the current grade level of the student.

References

External links 
 McLaughlin's Official Website

1964 establishments in Florida
Educational institutions established in 1964
Buildings and structures in Lake Wales, Florida
Public middle schools in Florida
Schools in Polk County, Florida